John Schoolcraft may refer to:
 John L. Schoolcraft, U.S. Representative from New York
 John Schoolcraft (assemblyman), member of the New York State Assembly